J.P. Bekasiak (born January 1, 1982) is a Canadian football defensive tackle who most recently played for the Montreal Alouettes of the Canadian Football League. He was drafted as the fourth overall pick in the 2007 CFL Draft by the Hamilton Tiger-Cats. He played college football with the Toledo Rockets.

References

External links
Just Sports Stats
Montreal Alouettes bio

1982 births
Living people
Canadian football defensive linemen
Montreal Alouettes players
Players of Canadian football from Alberta
Canadian football people from Edmonton
Toledo Rockets football players